Kerem Kabadayı (born 20 December 1977) is a Turkish writer and musician (drummer). He is a founding member and party Turkish rock-band Mor ve Ötesi.

Biography 
He was born on 20 December 1977 in Ankara, Turkey, to  Ülkü (Yulku) Kabadayı and his wife Müjde.

Education 
From 1983 to 1988 Kerem studied at the Bahariye Primary School (Bahariye İlkokulu), and from 1988 to 1996 he studied at the private German Lycée in Istanbul, where he met Harun Tekin. In 2000, he graduated from Koç University's Faculty of Production. Between 2001 and 2004, Kerem continued his study at the Department of History of Architecture, Urban and Contemporary Art of the Boğaziçi University. He graduated with his work "Capitalist urbanization in Turkey between 1920 and early 1990s: an alternative interpretation" with an inclination to the Marxist theory of history, and urbanization".

In the time between 2000 and 2004, he worked as a lecturer at the Faculty of Science and Literature of Koç Üniversity. He resigned from the job, and began teaching at the postgraduate program in History of Architecture at the Istanbul Technical University.

Creative activity 
Literature
Kerem's first article was published in the Journal of Computer Technology "Amiga Dünyası" in 1992. But in the same year, the magazine ceased to exist. Since 2003, Kabadayı has been writing in the journal "Asklepios" (Journal of Medicine).

Music
Kerem Kabadayı started playing drums as an amateur in 1990. Then, he took lessons from the drummer of Turkish rock band "Whisky Alpeya Assen SALT", and continued a musical career with the group "Decision", composed of Şahin Yalabık (vocals), Harun Tekin (guitar), Derin Esmer (guitar), Alper Tekin (bass) in 1994.

Later, Şahin Yalabık musicians decided to move to the Turkish lyrics, who founded in 1995 the group Mor ve Ötesi ("Violet and ultra"). The first album Şehir was published in 1996. Kerem Kabadayı became the author of four songs of the album: Sabahın Köründe, Uyku, Past and Reality. Uyku is the first song of the Turkish language.

External links
 

1977 births
Architectural historians
Deutsche Schule Istanbul alumni
Eurovision Song Contest entrants for Turkey
Eurovision Song Contest entrants of 2008
Istanbul Technical University alumni
Living people
Koç University alumni
Mor ve Ötesi members
Musicians from Ankara
Turkish rock musicians
Turkish socialists

21st-century drummers